The 2022 Pittsburgh Panthers women's soccer team represented University of Pittsburgh during the 2022 NCAA Division I women's soccer season.  The Panthers were led by head coach Randy Waldrum, in his fifth season.  They played home games at Ambrose Urbanic Field.  This was the team's 27th season playing organized women's college soccer and their 10th playing in the Atlantic Coast Conference.

The Panthers finished the season 14–5–3 overall and 5–3–2 in ACC play to finish in sixth place.  As the sixth seed in the ACC Tournament they tied Notre Dame 1–1, but lost the ensuing penalty shoot-out 5–4.  They received an at-large bid to the NCAA Tournament, the first tournament bid in program history. As the fourth-seed in the Florida State Bracket, they defeated  in the First Round and, fifth-seed  in the Second Round before traveling to first-seed Florida State in the Round of 16.  The Panther's run would end in Tallahassee were they lost 3–0.

Previous season 

The Panthers finished the season 11–7–0 overall, and 4–6–0 in ACC play to finish in ninth place.  They did not qualify for the ACC Tournament and were not invited to the NCAA Tournament.

Offseason

Departures

Incoming Transfers

Recruiting Class

Source:

Squad

Roster

Team management

Source:

Schedule

Source:

|-
!colspan=6 style=""| Non-Conference Regular Season

|-
!colspan=6 style=""| ACC Regular season

|-
!colspan=6 style=""| ACC Tournament

|-
!colspan=6 style=""| NCAA Tournament

Awards and honors

Rankings

References

Pittsburgh
Pittsburgh
2021
Pittsburgh women's soccer
Pittsburgh